Antonia Maria Girelli (ca. 1730 - died after 1773), was an Italian opera singer. She was engaged in the Divadlo v Kotcích in 1760-1763, where she was the primadonna at the time.

References 

 Starší divadlo v českých zemích do konce 18. století. Osobnosti a díla, ed. A. Jakubcová, Praha: Divadelní ústav – Academia 2007
 http://encyklopedie.idu.cz/index.php/Girelli,_Antonia_Maria
 http://www.treccani.it/enciclopedia/antonia-maria-girelli_(Dizionario-Biografico)/

1730 births
1773 deaths